Baraki may refer to:

Baraki Barak, Garissa County, Kenya
Baraki, Afghanistan
Baraki District, Algiers Province, Algeria
Baraki, Algiers
Baraki, Iran

Poland
Baraki, Krasnystaw County, in Lublin Voivodeship (east Poland)
Baraki, Kraśnik County, in Lublin Voivodeship (east Poland)
Baraki, Podlaskie Voivodeship (north-east Poland)
Baraki, Lublin County, in Lublin Voivodeship (east Poland)
Baraki, Subcarpathian Voivodeship (south-east Poland)
Baraki, Masovian Voivodeship (east-central Poland)

Other uses
 Yosef Baraki (born 1989), Canadian filmmaker, writer, and producer

See also
 
 Barak (disambiguation)